Be Forewarned is the third studio album by American doom metal band Pentagram. It was released in 1994 by Peaceville Records. It was re-released in 2005 as a digipak CD and in 2010 as a double vinyl LP by Svart Records.

Track listing
(Songwriters listed in brackets.)
 "Live Free and Burn" (Victor Griffin, Joe Hasselvander) – 3:07
 "Too Late" (Griffin) – 4:37
 "Ask No More" (Bobby Liebling) – 4:06
 "The World Will Love Again" (Hasselvander) – 5:13
 "Vampyre Love" (Griffin) – 3:40
 "Life Blood" (Griffin, Adam Forrest) – 7:01
 "Wolf's Blood" (Griffin) – 4:26
 "Frustration" (Liebling) – 3:36
 "Bride of Evil" (Hasselvander) – 4:34
 "Nightmare Gown" (Liebling) – 2:53
 "Petrified" (Liebling, Hasselvander) – 5:53
 "A Timeless Heart" (Liebling) – 2:23
 "Be Forewarned" (Liebling) – 7:14

Personnel
Pentagram
Bobby Liebling – vocals
Victor Griffin – guitar, piano, backing vocals on "Life Blood"
Martin Swaney – bass
Joe Hasselvander – drums

Production
Chris Murphy – producer, engineer
Noel Summerville – mastering

References

1994 albums
Pentagram (band) albums
Peaceville Records albums